Sonia Ganassi (born 1966) is an Italian mezzo-soprano. Born in Reggio Emilia, she made her debut as Rosina in Rossini’s The Barber of Seville in Rome in 1992. She has performed in many of the world’s famous opera houses including the Metropolitan Opera in New York City, the Royal Opera House in London and the Teatro alla Scala, Milan. She is best known for her work in the bel canto repertoire.  Her roles in Rossini operas also include soprano parts, such as Elisabetta in Elisabetta, regina d'Inghilterra (ROF, 2004), Elena in La donna del lago (Lady of the Lake) (Rossini in Wildbad, 2006), Ermione (ROF, 2008), and Elcia in Mosè in Egitto (ROF, 2011). In 2009 she participated in a live recording of Giuseppe Verdi's Messa da Requiem conducted by Antonio Pappano (EMI Classics 6 98936 2). In October 2019 she debuted the leading role of Lady Macbeth in Verdi's Macbeth at the Teatro Lirico di Cagliari.

Repertory
Her roles included:

References

External links
Teatro delle Muse Ancona 
Streamopera.com/Sonia Ganassi 

Italian opera singers
Operatic mezzo-sopranos
Living people
1966 births